Sidi Kaddour El Alami also transliterated as Qaddur al-Alami (born 1742 in Meknes, died 1850) is one of Morocco's best known poets, especially well known for his songs. His full name was Abd al-Qadir ibn Mohammed ibn Ahmad ibn Abi-l-Qasim al-Idrisi al-Alami al-Hamdani and he was known under the name Sayyidi Qaddur al-Alami at-Talibi al-Abd as-Salami. He was a songwriter in the genre of the malhun and founded the sufi zawiyya Alamin in Meknes. This zawiyya became one of the centres from which the malhun would spread. He grew up in Meknes, and is considered a saint and one of the greatest poets of North Africa in the neo-classical and popular style.

References

J. Jouin, "Un poème de Si Kaddour el 'Alami", in Hesp. 46 (1959), p. 87-103.
Eugène Aubin, Morocco of To-day, 1906 p. 274
Abdelmajid Fennich, Dari ya dari (My House, O My House) Play about the life of Sidi El Alami, 2003
Audio "Tawassolat"  (retrieved August 25, 2008)

Moroccan songwriters
People from Meknes
1742 births
1850 deaths
18th-century Moroccan people
19th-century Moroccan people
18th-century Moroccan writers
19th-century Moroccan writers
18th-century Moroccan poets
17th-century Moroccan poets